The 2013–14 Montana Grizzlies basketball team represented the University of Montana during the 2013–14 NCAA Division I men's basketball season. The Grizzlies, led by eighth year head coach Wayne Tinkle, played their home games at Dahlberg Arena and were members of the Big Sky Conference. They finished the season 17–13, 12–8 in Big Sky play to finish in a three way tie for second place. They lost in the quarterfinals of the Big Sky Conference tournament to Portland State.

On May 29, head coach Wayne Tinkle resigned to take the head coaching position at Oregon State.

Roster

Schedule

|-
!colspan=9 style="background:#660033; color:#848482;"| Exhibition

|-
!colspan=9 style="background:#660033; color:#848482;"| Regular season

|-
!colspan=9 style="background:#660033; color:#848482;"| Big Sky tournament

See also
2013–14 Montana Lady Griz basketball team

References

Montana Grizzlies basketball seasons
Montana
Grizz
Grizz